Tim Mayotte was the defending champion but lost in the semifinals to no.1 seeded Boris Becker.

Becker won the singles title at the 1987 Stella Artois Championships tennis tournament by defeating Jimmy Connors in the final 6–7, 6–3, 6–4.

Seeds

  Boris Becker (champion)
  Stefan Edberg (quarterfinals)
  Mats Wilander (first round)
  Yannick Noah (first round)
  Jimmy Connors (final)
  Tim Mayotte (semifinals)
  Pat Cash (semifinals)
  David Pate (quarterfinals)
  Kevin Curren (third round)
  Scott Davis (first round)
  Robert Seguso (first round)
  Slobodan Živojinović (first round)
  Ramesh Krishnan (quarterfinals)
  Amos Mansdorf (third round)
  Wally Masur (third round)
  Tim Wilkison (first round)

Draw

Finals

Top half

Section 1

Section 2

Bottom half

Section 3

Section 4

External links
 1987 Stella Artois Championships draw

Singles